The Long Knife is a 1958 British crime film directed by Montgomery Tully and starring Joan Rice, Sheldon Lawrence and Victor Brooks. The screenplay concerns a young nurse who becomes drawn into criminal activities.

Cast
 Joan Rice as Jill Holden
 Sheldon Lawrence as Ross Waters
 Dorothy Brewster as Angela
 Ellen Pollock as Mrs Cheam
 Victor Brooks as Superintendent Leigh
 Alan Keith as Doctor Ian Probus
 Arthur Gomez as Sergeant Bowles

References

External links

1958 films
British crime films
Films directed by Montgomery Tully
1958 crime films
1950s English-language films
1950s British films